The Louisville Stakes is Grade III American Thoroughbred horse race for horses age four years and older run over a distance of one and one half miles (12 furlongs) on the Turf scheduled annually in late May or early June at Churchill Downs in Louisville, Kentucky. The event offers a purse of $200,000.

History

The event is named in honor of the city of Louisville where the Churchill Downs racetrack is located.

The event has a long and inconsistent history since its first running in 1895 as the Louisville Handicap. The inaugural event was held at a distance of  miles on the dirt on 15 May 1895 as the third event on a six race card attracting four runners which was won by the favorite Henry Young. The event was shortened for the next running in 1896 but was not held in 1897.

Between 1900 and 1906 the event was not held and when it was resumed in 1907 it was held at the shorter distance of six furlongs.

Between World War I and World War II the event was only held once in 1938 at the longer distance of  miles. In 1946 the event once again resumed in the late fall, initially as the Churchill Downs Special and then back to the original name in 1947 at the distance of  miles. After being idle between 1953–1956 for four years the event was reschedule back to the spring at the shorter distance of  miles.

In 1987 the event was carded for the turf course for the first time at a distance of one mile. The distance has been increased three times with current distance set in 2007. The event was run in divisions in 1991.

The event was classified as a Grade III in 2002 and has held that grading since.

Six fillies or mares have won this event with Keertana the only mare to win this race at the current distance.

Since its inauguration in 1895, two horses have won this race three times, both accomplishing the rare feet in consecutive years.

Records
Speed record
 miles:  2:26.01 – Bullards Alley  (2016)
 miles:  2:14.09 – Kim Loves Bucky (2013)
 miles:  1:47.69 – Lotus Pool  (1992)

Margins 
 8 lengths – Tiger Rebel  (1946)

Most wins
 3 – Silverfoot (2004, 2005, 2006)
 3 – Chorwon (1997, 1998, 1999)

Most wins by an owner
 7 – Mrs. Joe (Dorothy Dorsett) Brown (1959, 1966, 1967, 1968, 1969, 1972, 1974)

Most wins by a jockey
 4 – Robby Albarado (2002, 2004, 2005, 2008)
 4 – Larry Melancon (1977, 1978, 1989, 1994)
 4 – Jimmy Combest (1959, 1967, 1968, 1969)
 4 – Steve Brooks (1946, 1947, 1948, 1952)

Most wins by a trainer
 5 – William I. Mott (1987, 1996, 2005, 2006, 2007)
 6 –  Alcee Richard (1959, 1966, 1967, 1968, 1969, 1972)

Winners

Legend:

 
 

Notes:

† In 2002, Two Point Two Mill won but was disqualified after an incident in the stretch and was set back to eighth place. The disqualification resulted in the declaration of Pisces and Classic Par as winners who had dead heated.

§ Ran as part of an entry

‡ Filly or Mare

References

Graded stakes races in the United States
Turf races in the United States
Open middle distance horse races
Recurring sporting events established in 1895
Churchill Downs horse races
1895 establishments in Kentucky
Grade 3 stakes races in the United States